Diego Queiróz de Oliveira (born June 22, 1990), known as Diego Oliveira, is a Brazilian footballer who plays for FC Tokyo.

Career
Recent sides include the Paraná, Qatari side Al-Mesaimeer, Noroeste and South Korean side Suwon Bluewings. On 22 April 2015, Diego signed for Brazilian side Ponte Preta.

Club statistics

Honours

Club
FC Tokyo
J.League Cup : 2020

Individual
 J.League Best XI: 2019

References

External links
 Profile at Kashiwa Reysol
 

 

1990 births
Living people
Association football forwards
Brazilian footballers
Brazil international footballers
Brazilian expatriate footballers
Paraná Clube players
Esporte Clube Noroeste players
Esporte Clube Bahia players
Grêmio Osasco Audax Esporte Clube players
Boa Esporte Clube players
Associação Atlética Ponte Preta players
Suwon Samsung Bluewings players
K League 1 players
Expatriate footballers in Qatar
Expatriate footballers in South Korea
Brazilian expatriate sportspeople in Qatar
Brazilian expatriate sportspeople in South Korea
Kashiwa Reysol players
FC Tokyo players
J1 League players
Expatriate footballers in Japan
Footballers from Curitiba